The People's Rally for Progress (RPP) is a political party in Djibouti. It has dominated politics in the country since 1979, initially under the rule of President Hassan Gouled Aptidon. Today it is led by President Ismaïl Omar Guelleh and is in a coalition government with Front for the Restoration of Unity and Democracy (FRUD) and other parties. The RPP tends to hold more influence among the Issa population.

The RPP was founded in Dikhil on March 4, 1979. It was declared the sole legal party in October 1981, retaining this status until multiparty politics was introduced in the September 1992 referendum. At the party congress held on 19–20 March 1997, Gouled Aptidon was re-elected as RPP President and a 125-member Central Committee was elected. It contested the December 1997 parliamentary election in alliance with the moderate faction of FRUD (which had signed a peace agreement with the government in December 1994), and this alliance won 79% of the vote, taking all 65 seats in the National Assembly.

On February 4, 1999, President Gouled Aptidon announced that he would retire at the time of the next election, and an extraordinary congress of the RPP, chose Guelleh as its presidential candidate. As the joint candidate of the RPP and moderate wing of the Front for the Restoration of Unity and Democracy (FRUD), Guelleh won the presidential election held on April 9, 1999 with 74% of the vote, defeating his only challenger, the independent candidate Moussa Ahmed Idriss.

In the parliamentary election held on 10 January 2003, the party was part of the Union for a Presidential Majority (Union pour la Majorité Présidentielle, UMP), that won 63% of the popular vote and all 65 seats.

The RPP opened its Eighth Ordinary Congress on March 4, 2004, coinciding with the party's 25th anniversary. At this congress, Guelleh was unanimously re-elected as RPP President by acclamation for another three-year term, and the RPP Central Committee was expanded from 180 to 250 members. On March 4, 2007, the RPP held its Ninth Ordinary Congress; Guelleh was again re-elected as RPP President, and three women were added to the Political Bureau, expanding it to 17 members. It contested the February 2008 parliamentary election together with its UMP coalition partners, and the UMP again won all 65 seats amidst an opposition boycott.

Electoral history

Presidential elections

National Assembly elections

See also 
Mohamed Dini Farah

References

External links
 Official website (archived 20 October 2019)

Political parties in Djibouti
Parties of one-party systems
1979 establishments in Djibouti
Political parties established in 1979